Erasmo Bartoli Filippino, or Erasmo di Bartolo, called padre Raimo (1606–1656), was an Italian priest, composer, and teacher at the conservatories in Naples.

Bartolo was born in Gaeta. His students included Giovanni Salvatore. He died in the Naples plague of 1656.

Works, editions and recordings
Quarant'ore con musica a quattro chori.
Recordings:
psalm on Vespro Solenne (Napoli 1632). with works by G. M. Sabino, Majello. (Symphonia 91S04) 1993

References

1656 deaths
1606 births
People from Gaeta
17th-century Italian Roman Catholic priests
17th-century deaths from plague (disease)
17th-century Italian composers